Niagara Amusement Park and Splash World is an  amusement park in Grand Island, New York. It features a theme park, water park, and is adjacent to a KOA campground. The park is owned by STORE Capital and operated by IB Parks & Entertainment.

History

Fantasy Island, Inc. (1961–1981)

Fantasy Island was founded by real estate developer Lawrence Grant, and was opened on July 1, 1961. It was designed by co-financier and local jeweler Gerald Birzon and constructed by Milton Milstein and Associates. The ownership group was formed under the name Fantasy Land, Inc. before changing soon after to Fantasy Island, Inc. The group had originally planned to call the park Fantasy Land, but changed the name for legal reasons after finding out there was already an area of Disneyland called Fantasyland.

Upon opening, the park occupied only  of land that was divided into five themed areas: Action Town, Animal Kingdom, Garden of Fables, Indian Village and Western Town. Action Town featured amusement rides, Animal Kingdom featured a petting zoo, Garden of Fables featured explorable recreations of fairy tale scenes, Indian Village featured Native American dancers, and Western Town featured a live Wild West show.

To promote the park, WGR-TV aired a live weekly television program on Saturday mornings from 1961 to 1962 titled Fantasy Island Show featuring the park's characters and puppeteers performing for an all-children studio audience. The show's host and protagonist was Buckskin Joe, portrayed by park general manager Clyde "Buddy" Farnan.

A 2,500-seat outdoor arena was constructed in 1965 for French lion tamer Jean "Tarzan" Zerbini's circus. Actor Jim Carrey grew up in nearby Ontario and would vacation at Fantasy Island, citing Zerbini's show as a fond memory.

Citing the 1979 oil crisis and rising cost of gasoline, the park reported a 62% drop in profits during the 1979 season. The park was put up for sale that same year.

After dwindling attendance stemming from Western New York's rust belt economic decline, Fantasy Island, Inc. declared bankruptcy and the park did not operate for the 1982 season.

Charles R. Wood Enterprises (1982–1989)

The park was acquired out of bankruptcy in November 1982 by Charles R. Wood Enterprises, headed by Charles Wood, founder of Great Escape in Queensbury, New York.

A new themed area called Water World, a water park, was added to the site in 1984. Wood also installed an 800-seat picnic pavilion that was previously used at the 1982 World's Fair.

Arto Monaco was commissioned to redesign Garden of Fables, constructing a castle with moat that was encircled by a horse-drawn carriage he had previously built for Land of Makebelieve.

International Broadcasting Corporation (1989–1992)

Wood sold the park along with Great Escape to International Broadcasting Corporation (IBC) in April 1989 for $36 million. As part of the deal, Wood would stay on as chief executive officer of the park and his son-in-law, Tom Wages, was retained as general manager.

Following the closure of nearby Crystal Beach Park after the 1989 season, that park's famed Comet roller coaster was purchased by Charles Wood at auction in October 1989 for $210,000, disassembled and stored indefinitely at Fantasy Island.

In June 1990, Michael Murach was paralyzed from the head down while performing a high diving act at the park when he slipped on a 3-meter diving board during a comedy act and fell 20-feet, hitting his head on the edge of the concrete pool. Murach was years later awarded damages of $58.6 million after a jury found International Broadcasting Corporation 100% liable for his injury. The end of the diving board was not installed at a proper distance away from the edge of the pool to prevent such an incident from occurring.

In August 1991, 14-year-old Kenneth Margerum fell  to his death from the park's Ferris wheel after his seat dropped from its axle. It was revealed that the park operators routinely removed one or two seats from the ride each day to prevent the ride from moving around in high winds during off-hours. Each time the ride opened, the seats were bolted back onto the frame of the ride. Investigators found that only one side of the victim's seat had been bolted properly, causing Margerum's seat to drop from its axle and subsequently leading to his death.

Attendance began to dwindle as parents became concerned over the park's safety following Margerum's death.

Charles R. Wood Enterprises (1992–1994)

Charles Wood reacquired the park along with Great Escape in October 1992 for $14 million when International Broadcasting Corporation went bankrupt. In his second stint of ownership, Wood changed the park's name to Two Flags Over Niagara Fun Park.

Martin's Shows (1994–2016)

Martin DiPietro, owner of Martin's Shows, purchased the park and renamed it Martin's Fantasy Island in January 1994. Charles Wood took the original Comet roller coaster and reassembled it at his Great Escape park later that year. DiPietro would install his own roller coaster named the Silver Comet in 1999 that was inspired by the original.

STORE Capital (2016–present)

Apex Parks Group

Martin DiPietro sold the park's land to STORE Capital in May 2016, and Apex Parks Group began leasing the property from STORE that same month. The park returned to its original name of Fantasy Island.

Reports surfaced in 2018 and 2019 that the general condition of the park had deteriorated, with many attractions not operational due to either mechanical failure or under-staffing.

On February 19, 2020, following reports that Apex Parks Group had put the park's rides up for sale, the company confirmed that the park had permanently closed. A settlement was reached with the Attorney General's office to refund customers that had purchased 2020 season passes.

IB Parks & Entertainment
Gene Staples, owner of 	IB Parks & Entertainment, entered a long-term agreement to lease the property from STORE Capital in May 2021. Staples also owns and operates Clementon Lake Park and Indiana Beach. The park was renamed Niagara Amusement Park and Splash World and reopened in August 2021. The 2021 season only featured the splash park, with rides being re-added to the park in time for the 2022 season.

Rides and attractions

Operating Attractions

Upcoming Attractions

Water attractions/rides

SBNO Rides

Former rides and attractions

Former roller coasters

Former water attractions/rides

Former dry rides

References

External links

Official website
IB Parks & Entertainment

Lifeguards training, water's running at Splash World

1961 establishments in New York (state)
Amusement parks opened in 1961
Amusement parks in New York (state)
Buildings and structures in Erie County, New York
IB Parks & Entertainment
Companies that filed for Chapter 11 bankruptcy in 2020